Antonis Migiakis (born 23 October 1911 – 19 November 1999) was a star forward for Greek football team Panathinaikos in the 1930s. He is probably best remembered for his memorable performance in his team's 8–2 victory over Olympiakos. During his career he was capped 17 times, scoring 3 goals, for the national football team of Greece.
He was the Coach of the national side for the 1952 Olympic Games.

References

External links

1911 births
Year of death missing
Panathinaikos F.C. players
Greek footballers
Greece international footballers
Association football forwards